Joseph Michael Sullivan (March 23, 1930 – June 7, 2013) was an American priest and later Auxiliary bishop of the Diocese of Brooklyn, New York  in the Roman Catholic Church from 1980 to 2005.

Biography
Born in Brooklyn, New York City, Sullivan was ordained to the priesthood for the Diocese of Brooklyn on June 2, 1956. He was elected executive vice-president of the board of trustees of Catholic Charities USA in 1979.

Sullivan was appointed titular bishop of Suliana on October 4, 1980, and was consecrated bishop on November 24, 1980. As auxiliary, Bishop Sullivan held the titles of Vicar for Human Services and regional bishop for the 62 parishes of Brooklyn's West Vicariate.  Sullivan served as chairman of the Catholic Medical Center of Brooklyn and Queens and of the Social Develop and World Peace department of the U.S. bishops' conference.  In the late 1990s, Bishop Sullivan chaired an ad hoc committee to produce a pastoral letter on charity, with which he intended "to reclaim the meaning of charity."

Sullivan retired on May 12, 2005.

He died on June 7, 2013, from injuries sustained in an auto accident May 30, 2013.

See also
Diocese of Brooklyn

References 

 

}
}

1930 births
2013 deaths
People from Brooklyn
20th-century Roman Catholic bishops in the United States
Catholics from New York (state)
21st-century Roman Catholic bishops in the United States